Blank Rome (formerly known as Blank Rome Comisky & McCauley) is an Am Law 100 firm (ranked 80th in the 2022 AmLaw 100 Survey) with 14 offices and more than 650 attorneys and principals who provide legal and advocacy services to clients in the United States and around the world.

Founded in 1946, Blank Rome represents a broad range of clients across a spectrum of industries. The firm has 13 offices in the United States, and expanded internationally in May 2011 by opening a Shanghai Representative Office in the People's Republic of China. In 2003, the firm established Blank Rome Government Relations LLC in Washington, D.C., a wholly owned subsidiary and government affairs firm that provides strategic lobbying, advocacy, and communications counsel.

History
Blank Rome was founded in 1946 in Philadelphia, PA, and has since expanded its geographic footprint across the United States with offices in Chicago, IL; Cincinnati, OH; Fort Lauderdale and Tampa, FL; Houston, TX; Los Angeles and Orange County, CA; New York City; Pittsburgh, PA; Princeton, NJ; Washington, D.C.; and Wilmington, DE, as well as internationally with a Representative Office in Shanghai, the People's Republic of China. The following combinations and additions have occurred:

 1959: Brumbelow & Comisky, Philadelphia
 1961: Newman & Master, Philadelphia
 1984: Wexler Weisman Forman & Shapiro, Philadelphia
 1998: Wigman, Cohen, Leitner & Myers, Washington, D.C.
 2000: Tenzer Greenblatt, New York
 2003: Dyer Ellis & Joseph, Washington, D.C.
 2005: Shack Siegel Katz & Flaherty, New York
 2006: Healy & Baillie, New York
 2011: Abrams Scott & Bickley, LLP, Houston 
 2012: Janis, Schuelke & Wechsler, Washington, D.C.
 2013: Bell, Ryniker & Letourneau, Houston
 2014: Finestone & Richter and Margolis & Tisman LLP, Los Angeles and San Francisco
 2015: Wong Cabello, Houston
 2016: Dickstein Shapiro LLP, Washington, D.C.; Phillips Lerner, Los Angeles
 2017: Kasowitz Benson Torres LLP, Los Angeles
 2019: Buter, Buzard, Fishbein & Royce LLP, Los Angeles; four-partner group from Katten Muchin Rosenman LLP, Chicago

Additionally, in 2003, the Firm established Blank Rome Government Relations LLC, a wholly owned subsidiary and government affairs firm in Washington, D.C.

Practice areas
Blank Rome's practice areas include commercial and corporate litigation; class action defense, financial institutions litigation and regulatory compliance (FILARC); corporate, M&A, and securities; cross border/international, energy, environmental, and mass torts; finance, restructuring, and bankruptcy; government contracts; government relations and political law; insurance recovery; intellectual property and technology; intellectual property litigation; labor and employment; maritime and international trade; matrimonial and family law; real estate; tax, benefits, and private client; and white collar defense and investigations.

Key industry areas include aerospace, defense and government services, aviation, chemical, energy, finance and restructuring, financial services, gaming and entertainment, healthcare, hospitality, investment management, life sciences, maritime, private equity and investment funds, real estate, technology, and transportation.

Blank Rome Government Relations LLC is a wholly owned subsidiary and government affairs firm. Key services include Advocacy, Congressional Oversight and Investigations, Government Business, Government Ethics & Compliance, and Legislation & Regulation.

Office Locations
 Chicago, IL
 Cincinnati, OH 
 Fort Lauderdale, FL
 Houston, TX
 Los Angeles, CA
 New York, NY
 Orange County, CA
 Philadelphia, PA
 Pittsburgh, PA
 Princeton, NJ
 Shanghai, China
 Tampa, FL
 Washington, D.C.
 Wilmington, DE

Pro Bono Activities
Blank Rome promotes pro bono involvement by matching its attorneys and paralegals with meaningful legal clinics, initiatives, and partner nonprofit organizations to implement the firm’s formal pro bono policy, which requires each attorney and paralegal to provide at least 25 hours of pro bono service each year, with an aspirational goal of providing at least 75 hours of pro bono service.

The firm achieved impressive results on a wide range of pro bono projects. Highlights include:

 Continuing to assist Afghan refugees seeking Humanitarian Parole in the United States, in addition to helping with expedited Afghan asylum cases 
 Partnering with the Lawyers Committee for Civil Rights to organize and staff a nonpartisan election protection hotline for voters in the 2022 mid-term elections
 Helping low-income senior citizens to draft and execute their life planning documents 
 Working to assist transgender clients with legal name and gender marker changes 
 Helping refugees to take their next step toward citizenship by applying for Green Cards 
 Working with veterans seeking to upgrade their military discharge status 
 Assisting small businesses and nonprofit organizations with corporate, real estate, tax, and intellectual property issues

Blank Rome has been ranked in Law360 Pulse’s Pro Bono and Social Impact ratings in recognition of the firm’s commitment and dedication to advancing pro bono efforts in the legal industry and elsewhere.  

The firm was also recognized in the top 50 firms nationwide in The American Lawyer's 2022 Pro Bono Scorecard for pro bono work completed as well as dedicated hours and commitment to providing pro bono assistance in 2021, marking the third year that the firm has been recognized for its performance and dedication to pro bono.

Notable lawyers and alumni
Edward Cahn, former chief United States district judge for the Eastern District of Pennsylvania, serves as of counsel in Blank Rome's Philadelphia office.
Steve Castor
Marvin Comisky, former chairman emeritus of Blank Rome and former head of the Philadelphia and state bar associations
Geraldine Ferraro, former congresswoman and Vice-Presidential candidate, previously served as a principal at Blank Rome Government Relations LLC.
James Giles, former chief judge of the United States District Court for the Eastern District of Pennsylvania, serves as of counsel in Blank Rome's Philadelphia office.
David F. Girard-diCarlo, former chairman of the South Eastern Pennsylvania Transportation Authority, elected co-chair and managing partner in 1988, reelected five times, serving until 2000; also appointed as the CEO of subsidiary Blank Rome Government Relations LLC, the lobbying branch of the law firm based in Washington, D.C.; served as the U.S. ambassador to Austria from July 2008 to January 2009. 
Keith Gottfried, former general counsel to the United States Department of Housing and Urban Development and a senior official in the administration of President George W. Bush, was a partner in Blank Rome's Washington, D.C., office.
Nathaniel R. Jones, former judge of the United States Court of Appeals for the Sixth Circuit and former general counsel to the NAACP, previously served as the Firm's inaugural Chief Diversity and Inclusion Officer.
Frederica Massiah-Jackson, Philadelphia County Court of Common Pleas judge, worked at the law firm before her election to the bench in 1983.
David A. Norcross, former chairman of the New Jersey Republican State Committee and executive assistant to New Jersey Governor William T. Cahill, was a partner in Blank Rome's Philadelphia office.
Stephen Orlofsky, former judge of the United States District Court for the District of New Jersey, is the chair of Blank Rome's Princeton office and leads the Firm's appellate practice.
Gil Stein, former president and general counsel to the National Hockey League, worked at the law firm before becoming an executive with the Philadelphia Flyers in 1976.

References

External links
Blank Rome's firm profile from Chambers & Partners

Law firms based in Philadelphia
Lobbying firms
Law firms established in 1946
1946 establishments in Pennsylvania